Bangladesh–Portugal relations refer to the bilateral relations between Bangladesh and Portugal. Bangladesh opened an embassy in Lisbon in 2012 and appointed its first ambassador to Portugal the following year. Portugal has a non resident ambassador in New Delhi, India.

History 

Following Vasco Da Gama's landing in southern India, Portuguese traders from Malacca, Ceylon and Bombay began traversing the sea routes of the Bay of Bengal. In the early 16th century, the Bengal Sultanate received official Portuguese envoys. The Sultan gave permission for the establishment of the Portuguese settlement in Chittagong, making it the first European exclave in Bengal. Bengal was identified by the traders as "the richest country to trade with". They had many trade posts in Bengal and used to control the thriving sea port at Chittagong. After subsequent wars against the Arakans and the Mughals, the Portuguese lost their control over Chittagong in the 17th century. However, their descendants still live in the old parts of the city. The Portuguese missionaries laid the foundation for Christianity in Bangladesh.

High level visits 
Former foreign minister of Bangladesh Dipu Moni paid an official visit to Lisbon in 2010.

Economic cooperation 
Bangladesh and Portugal have shown their deep interest to expand the bilateral economic activities between the two countries and have been taking necessary steps in this regard. In 2010, the two countries signed an agreement on avoidance of double taxation. Both countries have emphasized on the necessity of interaction between the business communities of the two countries through exchange of business delegations.

Bangladeshi diaspora in Portugal 
As of 2012, there are about 15,000 Bangladeshi expatriates working in Portugal.

See also 
 Foreign relations of Bangladesh
 Foreign relations of Portugal

References 

 
Portugal
Bilateral relations of Portugal